William Ewart Ebenezer Gerrish (18 June 1898 – 7 June 1978) was a British philatelist who was added to the Roll of Distinguished Philatelists in 1958.

References

Signatories to the Roll of Distinguished Philatelists
1898 births
1978 deaths
British philatelists
Presidents of the Royal Philatelic Society London